Patrick Jevon Johnson (born August 10, 1976) is a former American football wide receiver.

Johnson majored in Journalism and Communications at the University of Oregon from 1994 to 1997, and attended the Craig James Broadcast School in 2000. Mr. Johnson was a two-sport athlete at the University of Oregon, excelling in both football and track, and winning numerous awards and championships during his collegiate athletic career.

A two-sport athlete, Johnson was an Olympic-caliber sprinter before beginning his National Football League career.

Prep
As a senior at Redlands High School in Redlands California, Johnson was All- Citrus Belt League, Honorable Mention All CIF, a member of the Tacoma News Tribune's Western top 100 list, and team MVP in his only year of playing running back for the Terriers. On the track as a junior, Johnson managed to finish fourth place in the 200-meter final at the California State Track and Field Championships. During his senior campaign, Johnson had over 1000 all-purpose yards as the starting halfback for the Terriers, and was amongst the nation's elite prep sprinters. Johnson led all national preps in both the 100 and 200 meters for most of the season. Johnson also notched impressive wins at the prestigious prep track and field meets, the Arcadia Invitational (100m), Golden West invitational (100, 200m) and the National Scholastic Outdoor Championships (200m). Later that summer, Johnson represented the United States in the 4 × 100 m relay at the 1994 World Junior Championships in Athletics in Lisbon, Portugal, garnering a silver medal in the games.

Even though Johnson had signed a letter of intent to play college football at the University of Oregon, he was faced with the tough decision of turning pro in track as a recently graduated high school senior. Doing so would have required him to forfeit all of his collegiate eligibility. Transferring to a football powerhouse, (Oregon was not at the time) or transferring to a collegiate sprinting powerhouse were other alternatives to consider for Johnson, but would have required forfeiting a year of eligibility if he chose that direction. The Ducks track and field brass was only lukewarm at best to the possibility of Johnson participating in track and field while at the University of Oregon, but that quickly changed halfway into his senior track campaign as his times drastically improved from the year before. Johnson nearly relinquished his letter of intent to Oregon, but Johnson elected to continue with his plans to go based on his parents' plea for him to stay his course.

Collegiate
Johnson attended the University of Oregon where he was not only a member of their college football team but also of their track team.

As a collegiate sprinter at Oregon, he was one of the top sprinters in the nation defeating the legendary Carl Lewis in a 100 m race at the Drake Relays and winning the Pac-10 Championships in the 400 m as a freshman. Johnson was also a two-time NCAA All-America in the 100–200 meters in his only full season of competition on the track. Johnson was the pre-season favorite to win the NCAA 400m in his sophomore season and preseason pick to make the Olympic team that summer in 1996. Due to over-training early in the season, Johnson unfortunately had to watch the NCAA Championships from the grandstands that season from his home track, historic Hayward Field. Johnson respectively lost his defense of the Pac-10 400 meter title in 1996 placing second running the race at 80%. Citing the emotional toll of 1996 and the disappointment of missing the Olympics in his home state of Georgia, Johnson quit the team and never stepped on the track again for the Ducks.

Johnson was wingback and halfback in high school, but was converted to wide receiver at the University of Oregon. He was a part of arguably the most critical era in the rebuilding and emergence of the Oregon football program (1994-1997). Johnson managed to start in 8 contests during Oregon's Rose Bowl campaign in 1994, notching a then freshman record 30 receptions which has since been broken. The Ducks also had appearances in the Cotton and Las Vegas Bowls respectively, where Johnson was the offensive MVP in the latter blowout victory over the Air Force Academy.

Johnson was second-team All-Pac-10 wide receiver; All-Pac-10 as well as an All-American return specialist during his collegiate career. Johnson credits much of his development as a wide receiver to the early tutelage of former Oregon standout wide receiver Cristin McLemore.

Professional
In 1998, Johnson was the 42nd overall draft pick to the Baltimore Ravens. He later earned a Super Bowl ring when the Ravens won Super Bowl XXXV.  After four seasons with the Ravens, Johnson played one season with the Jacksonville Jaguars, followed by a season with the Washington Redskins, a brief stint with the Cincinnati Bengals that was derailed by a major hand injury suffered in a 2004 preseason contest against the Atlanta Falcons. Johnson signed an injury settlement with the Bengals in 2004, waiving his roster spot and went back to his Irving, Texas residence to rehab. Later that season in 2004, Johnson signed back with the Baltimore Ravens and was later released that season in order to sign former Pittsburgh Steelers quarterback Kordell Stewart. In 2005, Johnson rejoined the Ravens for an additional season.

Johnson first joined the CFL in May 2007 when he signed with the Edmonton Eskimos. He was later traded to the Toronto Argonauts on June 13, 2007 in exchange for second round pick in the 2008 CFL Canadian Draft.

On June 20, 2008, Johnson was released by the Toronto Argonauts following two preseason contests in order to sign David Boston.

Business and Philanthropy
Johnson has assisted several charities and non-profit organizations by volunteering and in fundraising efforts. Johnson raised 20,000 books for the program "Baltimore Reads" books for kids day, and guest modeled for Tommy Hilfiger's fundraiser for the Living Classrooms Organization while playing for the Baltimore Ravens, respectively. In 2003, Mr. Johnson interned with GOPAC while playing for the Washington Redskins, then chaired by former congressman and standout quarterback J.C. Watts.
GOPAC (Link to site), is a political action committee designed to train candidates for grassroots-level campaigning.

Johnson has accepted several keynote speaking engagements and most notably the Pigskin Preview, organized by Virginia Governor Bob McDonnell, and is a published writer, having co-authored an article for Worth and independently for Overtime Magazines, respectively. Johnson has consulted in the private equity, oil and gas, mining, gaming, nutraceutical, entertainment, internet, and real estate industries.

On February 16, 2018, three Johnson-controlled business entities, PDX Partners, Victura Construction Group, and Cherubim Interests, had their trading halted as the Securities and Exchange Commission (SEC) started an investigation into alleged investments in cryptocurrencies and blockchain technology.  The SEC questioned the accuracy of information provided by the companies with regard to these investments.

The Patrick Johnson Foundation was launched in 2003 and served as a national Philanthropic and programmatic not-for-profit organization.

References

External links
Just Sports Stats
Toronto Argonauts profile
DatabaseFootball stats

1976 births
Living people
People from Gainesville, Georgia
Sportspeople from the Atlanta metropolitan area
Players of American football from Georgia (U.S. state)
American football wide receivers
Oregon Ducks football players
Baltimore Ravens players
Jacksonville Jaguars players
Washington Redskins players
American players of Canadian football
Canadian football slotbacks
Edmonton Elks players
Toronto Argonauts players